Badr bin Muhammad bin Abdullah bin Jalawi Al Saud 
() has been the governor of Al-Ahsa in Saudi Arabia since 13 December 1997.

See also
Al-Ahsa

Notes

Badr
Badr
Governors of provinces of Saudi Arabia
Living people
Badr
Year of birth missing (living people)